"Skechers" is a song by American YouTuber DripReport. The track was self-released on January 12, 2020, before being re-released by Arista Records, and was produced by Ouhboy. The track is DripReport's debut single, and is also his first charting single.

On May 27, 2020, Skechers launched a Skechers Million Mask Giveaway Dance Challenge in which Skechers donated 10 face masks to United Way of Greater Los Angeles for every dance video uploaded of the song on TikTok with hashtag #danceformasks or #MillionMaskChallenge, with @Skechers tagged in its caption. The maximum giveaway was of one million masks. The challenge ended on June 17, 2020.

Background 
Most of the song's success can be attributed to social media app TikTok, where over 10 million videos have been made with the song, with a total of more than 5 billion views. The first official music video has 136 million views on YouTube, while the second music video has 6 million views.

Composition 
"Skechers" is a short song, with a duration of 1 minute and 46 seconds. The track is written from the perspective of a man who's attempting to entice his romantic interest into a relationship. He's particularly fixated on the girl in question's "light-up Skechers", which inspires the title of the song itself. The lyrics are sung in a stereotypical Indian accent. It was written by DripReport and Ouhboy, the latter also producing the song. Official remixes of the song featuring American rapper Tyga and Indian rapper Badshah were later released.

The song is written in the key of A-flat minor with a tempo of 100 beats per minute.

Commercial performance 
"Skechers" charted in countries including New Zealand, Norway, UK, Australia, Ireland, Sweden, Switzerland, Germany and Canada.

Charts

Certifications

References 

2020 singles
2020 songs
American hip hop songs
Trap music songs
Arista Records singles